Letting Off the Happiness is the second studio album released by the indie rock band Bright Eyes. The album was released on November 2, 1998. It was the first release by Bright Eyes to feature and be produced by Mike Mogis, now a permanent member of the band. A vinyl re-release of the album was included in the Bright Eyes Vinyl Box Set in 2012. Guest musicians include members of Cursive, Tilly and the Wall, and Elephant 6 collective's Neutral Milk Hotel and of Montreal.

This album is the 23rd release of Saddle Creek Records. The album was reissued alongside a six-track companion EP by Dead Oceans on May 27, 2022.

Track listing

Personnel
Conor Oberst – vocals; guitar (1-5, 7-10); acoustic drums, electric drums (3); keyboards (6); piano (10)
Mike Mogis – atmospheric noises (2); pedal steel (3, 5, 8, 9); melodica, air organ (3); country guitar (4); keyboards (4, 6, 9); electric drums (8); organs (9); piano, bowed chimes (10); recording (2, 3, 10); mixing, mastering
Matt Maginn – bass (2)
Matt Focht – drums (2); percussion (10)
Matt Oberst – guitar (3)
Neely Jenkins – vocals (3, 8)
Andy LeMaster – vocals (4, 8); percussion (4); bass (5); lead guitar (8); recording, engineering (4, 5, 6, 9)
Jeremy Barnes – drums (4, 5, 6, 9); percussion (4); broken keyboards (6); accordion (9)
Kevin Barnes – Rhodes keyboard (5); angelic background vocals (9)
Ted Stevens – sloppy drums (8)
Aaron Druery – ebow bass (10)
Robb Nansel – finger cymbals (10)

Charts

References

External links
Saddle Creek Records

1998 albums
Bright Eyes (band) albums
Saddle Creek Records albums
Albums produced by Mike Mogis
Electroacoustic music albums